Pliomelaena assimilis is a species of tephritid or fruit flies in the genus Pliomelaena of the family Tephritidae.

Distribution
Japan, Taiwan.

References

Tephritinae
Insects described in 1968
Diptera of Asia